The Wojska Polskiego Avenue (before 1945 Falkenwalder Straße) is one of the main streets of the Polish city of Szczecin (length 6.9 km), running from the south-east to the north-west. It lies on the territory of eight municipal neighbourhoods: Centrum, Śródmieście-Zachód, Śródmieście-Północ, Łękno, Pogodno, Arkońskie-Niemierzyn, Zawadzkiego-Klonowica, and Głębokie-Pilchowo. It constitutes a section of voivodeship road 115.

Some press articles, tourist brochures, websites and even the official website of Szczecin City Hall claim that Wojska Polskiego is the longest street in Szczecin. However, the longest street is Floriana Krygiera Street (formerly Autostrada Poznańska), which is approximately 8.5 kilometres long.

History

Before 1945 
Today's Wojska Polskiego Avenue was originally a route leading from the Harbour Gate to the towns north-west of Szczecin. In 1858 a complex of Stoewer factory buildings was built at the intersection with Unii Lubelskiej Street. In 1870s by the section of the avenue between its intersection with Piotra Skargi Street and Szarych Szeregów Square villas of the Westend housing estate were erected. In 1879, at the junction with Piotra Skargi Street, a complex of buildings of a horse tram depot was built. From that depot the first horse trams left on 23 August 1879 on the route leading from Wojska Polskiego Avenue to Stanisława Staszica Street. In the 1890s the tram line was electrified, and the northern part of the avenue was partly developed with villas belonging to the Neu Westend housing estate. At the same time, plots on both sides of the avenue were developed from Szarych Szeregów Square to Zgody Square by erecting multi-storey tenement houses. Further construction investments along the avenue were carried out after the end of World War I, when blocks of flats were built north of Piotra Skargi Street. In 1938 the old tram depot at the junction with Piotra Skargi Street was closed and the new tram depot Straßenbahnhof West (today Pogodno depot) was opened.

1945–1973 
As a result of the bombing of Szczecin during World War II, part of the buildings within the area of Zgody Square were destroyed. In 1959 on the plot at the intersection with Małkowskiego Street a building for the Kosmos Cinema was constructed according to the design of Andrzej Korzeniowski. In 1962 one of the corners with Jagiellońska Street was filled with a block of flats designed by J. Karwowski. In 1963 a competition was announced for developing the plots created after removing the ruins of destroyed tenement houses. The competition was decided in favour of Szczecin architects Wacław Furmańczyk and Witold Jarzynka, who designed four identical 10-storey blocks of flats. Two of them were built near the intersection with Edmunda Bałuki Street, the third near the intersection with Bohaterów Getta Warszawskiego Street, and the fourth in the frontage between Zgody Square and Jagiellońska Street.

1973–2015 
On 1 December 1973, by decision of Mayor Jan Stopyra, tram traffic was withdrawn from the section of the avenue between Szarych Szeregów and Zwycięstwa Square. A year later, the section was modernised by renovating the pavements and roadways, installing traffic lights, planting trees and renovating the façades of buildings. At the junction with Piotra Ściegiennego and Królowej Jadwigi Streets a fountain in the form of a mosaic wall was erected, commonly referred to as the "Wailing Wall". From the early 1980s to 1994, the avenue was also repaired, along with the tram tracks, in the section from Szarych Szeregów Square to Bogumiły Street and further towards Głębokie Lake. In 1994, the depot at the junction with Piotra Skargi Street was cut off from the tram line.

In the 1990s, vacant plots between Zwycięstwa and Zgody Squares were filled with new houses. On 25 November 2001 the "Wailing Wall" was demolished and replaced by a fountain in the form of a pitcher pouring water, which after less than three years was devastated and finally dismantled.

After 2015 
In July and August 2015, the Szczecin Sociological Society (Polish Szczecińskie Towarzystwo Socjologiczne) and the Centre for Social and Economic Development (Polish Centrum Rozwoju Społeczno-Gospodarczego) held public consultations on the future appearance of the section of Wojska Polskiego Avenue between Szarych Szeregów Square and Zwycięstwa Square. In the public consultation, residents rejected the possibility of reconstructing the tram track or turning the avenue into a pedestrian zone. In January 2017, the city held a second public consultation in which members of the neighbourhood councils and residents were able to choose between four concepts for the reconstruction of the avenue:

 1st concept: two carriageways with one traffic lane each, separated by parking spaces and greenery, 30 km/h speed limit zone;
 2nd concept: two carriageways with two traffic lanes each, with the central lanes shared with the tramway track, limiting passenger car traffic, allowing access to the avenue only for taxis, resident cars and buses,
 3rd concept: maintaining the current solution, i.e. two carriageways with two lanes each, limiting parking spaces by introducing greenery,
 4rd concept: return to the pre-1973 traffic model, i.e. two carriageways with two traffic lanes each, tram tracks in the two central lanes, restriction of parking spaces by introducing greenery.

Eventually, 1st concept won. In response to the abandonment of the restoration of the tram line, the Association of the Aesthetic and Modern Szczecin (Polish Stowarzyszenie Estetycznego i Nowoczesnego Szczecina) demanded that the city re-run the public consultation. In May 2017, city activists started collecting signatures for a civic resolution project on the restoration of tram traffic on Wojska Polskiego Avenue. A vote in favour of restoring the tram line was cast by 1,554 people, after which the resolution was put to a vote at a city council session. Ultimately, with 9 votes in favour, 9 against and 2 abstentions, the resolution was not adopted.

In June 2017, the city, in cooperation with the Association of Polish Architects, announced a competition for the design of the reconstruction of Wojska Polskiego Avenue from Zwycięstwa Square to Szarych Szeregów Square. The winning project was prepared by the Archaid design studio. At the end of 2020, the city announced a tender for renovation of the said section of the avenue in accordance with the winning design. The tender was settled in March 2021 in favour of the MTM company. The selected contractor shall be obliged to carry out the modernisation works within 24 months from the date of entering into the agreement for the realisation of each of the two investment stages.

Notable objects

Public transport

Nowadays 
As of 24 May 2021, the following public transport lines were running along Wojska Polskiego Avenue in the permanent traffic organisation:

 tram lines: 
 normal lines: 1, 9
 bus lines: 
 day lines: 53, 60, 87
 night lines: 529, 531

In the past 

 tram lines:
 normal day lines: 5 (1905–1945, 1948–1973), 7 (1934–1945, 1945–1973), 10 (1967–1973), 12 (1985–1988)
 night lines: 1N (1960–1996), 5N (1960–1973), 7N (1969–1973), 9N (1969–1996)

Numbering 

 Zawadzkiego-Klonowica: 184–202 even, 235 – 248
 Centrum: 1–63 odd
 Łękno: 105–121 odd, 122–142, 143–171 odd, 185
 Pogodno: 150–182 even, 189–231c odd
 Arkońskie-Niemierzyn: 187
 Śródmieście-Zachód: 2–62 odd
 Głębokie-Pilchowo: 245–254
 Śródmieście-Północ: 64–106

References 

Streets in Szczecin
Centrum, Szczecin